Ouf may refer to:

People
 -ouf (familial affix), a family name affix in Norman-French and a French spelling of Arabic names ending with -ūf, see List of family name affixes
 Ouf (surname), a Norman surname concentrated around Le Havre, from Old Norse personal name Úlfr
 ouf, a usual French Verlan word from fou meaning "crazy, mad, fool"
 Ufentina (abbreviated: Ouf.) a Roman Empire voting division, a Roman tribe

Surnamed
 Abdurrahman Ibn Ouf (581-654), a companion of the Prophet Mohammed
 Ezzat Abu Ouf (musician), founding member of Egyptian rock band Les Petits Chats
 Heba Abu Ouf (squash player), Egyptian national champion of squash, cousin to pro squash player Lina El Tannir (born 1987)
 Haji Ouf, father of Iranian artist Aydin Aghdashloo (born 1940)
 Hazem Ouf (businessman), CEO since 2017 of chain restaurant Logan's Roadhouse
 Maha Abu Ouf, wife (married 1981) of Egyptian musician Omar Khorshid (1945-1981)
 Youssef Abou Ouf (1924-1989), Egyptian basketball player

Nicknamed
 Robert Citerne (born 1961, nicknamed "Bob le Ouf") French wheelchair fencer

Fictional characters
 King Ouf the First, main character from the 1877 opera L'étoile (opera)
 Ouf, character portrayed by Claude Brosset from the 1967 drama film Shock Troops (film)

Places
 Ouf-en-Ternois, Pas-de-Calais, Hauts-de-France, France; a commune

Other uses
 Nuts (2012 film), originally released and released in French as "Ouf", a French comedy film
 Beijing Eofa International Jet (ICAO airline code: OUF), see List of airline codes (B)
 Operation Urgent Fury (1983), the U.S. invasion of Grenada
 O-Unit Flippase (OUF), an enzymic protein related to the protein family MOP flippase

See also

 Osaka University of Foreign Studies (OUFS)
 
 
 Oeuf (disambiguation)
 EUF (disambiguation)